Junior Hockey Club Tolpar Ufa or Minor Hockey Club Tolpar Ufa (MHC Tolpar) is a junior ice hockey team from Ufa, which contains players from the Salavat Yulaev school. They are members of the Russian Junior Hockey League, the top tier of junior hockey in the country.

Name 
The MHL club's name must not be same as their affiliated Kontinental Hockey League club's name. So the former name of the team Salavat Yulaev-2 was changed. There were some variants of new junior club name. Fans were invited to vote for Akbuzat, Bashkir Bees and Tolpar, but club's board decided to give the name Tolpar.

External links
Official Page

2009 establishments in Russia
Ice hockey clubs established in 2009
Ice hockey teams in Russia
Junior Hockey League (Russia) teams
Sport in Ufa